Stephanie Mary Fraser, Baroness Fraser of Craigmaddie (born 4 September 1968) is a British charity executive and life peer. She is the Chief Executive of Cerebral Palsy Scotland.

Early life and education
Fraser was born on 4 September 1968 in Glasgow, Scotland. She was educated at Arts Educational School, Tring Park, a private school in Tring, Hertfordshire, England, and at Stowe School, a public school in Stowe, Buckinghamshire. She studied history at the Trinity College, Cambridge, graduating with a Bachelor of Arts (BA) degree in 1990.

Political career 
Fraser was the Conservative candidate in Strathkelvin and Bearsden in the 2011 Scottish Parliament election.

In December 2020, it was announced that she would be receiving a life peerage. She entered the House of Lords as a Conservative peer on 26 January 2021. On 13 May 2021, she made her maiden speech during the Queen's Speech debate.

References

External links 

 Page at the Parliament of the United Kingdom
 

1968 births
Living people
21st-century British civil servants
21st-century British politicians
21st-century British women politicians
Conservative Party (UK) life peers
Life peeresses created by Elizabeth II
Scottish Conservative Party politicians
Scottish women activists
Scottish Conservative Party parliamentary candidates
People from Glasgow
People educated at Tring Park School for the Performing Arts
People educated at Stowe School
Alumni of Trinity College, Cambridge